The Resolution Funding Corporation (REFCORP) is a government-sponsored enterprise that provides funds to the Resolution Trust Corporation, which was established to finance the bailout of savings and loan associations in the wake of the savings and loan crisis of the 1980s in the United States.  It was established by the United States Congress in the summer of 1989, as part of the Financial Institutions Reform, Recovery, and Enforcement Act of 1989. The Resolution Funding Corporation is a 501(c)(1) organization. As of July 1997, the Resolution Funding Corporation's debt stood at $30 billion.

On August 5, 2011, the Federal Housing Finance Agency announced that the Federal Home Loan Banks had repaid all of the interest on the Resolution Funding Corporation bonds. The Banks were required to pay 20 percent of their profits (after payments to the Affordable Housing Program) toward the RefCorp bond payments.  These moneys will now be paid into a restricted retained earnings account until the Bank's account equals one percent of that Bank's outstanding consolidated obligations.

References

See also 
 Financing Corporation (FICO)

Bank regulation in the United States
Savings and loan crisis
United States government-sponsored enterprises